Coast Guard Integrated Support Command, as a US Coastguard component, could mean:
Integrated Support Command Kodiak in Alaska
Integrated Support Command Alameda in Alameda, California